The 1980–81 Phoenix Suns season was the 13th season for the Phoenix Suns of the National Basketball Association. At 57–25, the team had finished with its best regular season record. For the Suns, they had appeared in their first Finals five years ago but never could claim a divisional title as their own. Atop the Western Conference standings for the first time, the Suns had earned a bye in the first round of the playoffs. The offense was highlighted by a balanced attack, with four starters averaging 15 points or more a game, but none greater than 19. This, despite a trade that meant the departure of four-time All-NBA Paul Westphal, who was swapped for fourth year All-Star guard Dennis Johnson. In the conference semifinals, the Suns would meet the Kansas City Kings, a team they had defeated in the first round one season ago but found more difficult to handle this season. After a 22-point win in game one, the Suns would go on to lose game seven and the series. The Suns were led by head coach John MacLeod and played all home games in Arizona Veterans Memorial Coliseum.

Johnson was a tough defender and later earned NBA All-Defensive First Team honors. He was also named to the All-NBA First Team. In the All-Star Game, Johnson was joined by teammates Walter Davis and Truck Robinson. It was the first time the Suns sent three players to the All-Star Game.

Johnson and Robinson shared top scoring marks for the Suns with an average of 18.8 points a game, while Robinson also led the team in rebounds per game at 9.6. Davis averaged 18.0 points per game and Alvan Adams chipped in 14.9 for the second consecutive season. Adams, a 6'9" center/forward led the team in assists at 4.6 a game.

Offseason

NBA Draft

This was the first year in franchise history that none of the team's draft picks played for the franchise. Not only did no selection play for the Suns, none ever played a game in the NBA.

Roster

Regular season

Standings

Record vs. opponents

Playoffs

Game log

|- align="center" bgcolor="#ccffcc"
| 1
| April 7
| Kansas City
| W 102–80
| Johnson, Davis (16)
| Jeff Cook (12)
| three players tied (4)
| Arizona Veterans Memorial Coliseum12,660
| 1–0
|- align="center" bgcolor="#ffcccc"
| 2
| April 8
| Kansas City
| L 83–88
| Dennis Johnson (31)
| Truck Robinson (8)
| Alvan Adams (4)
| Arizona Veterans Memorial Coliseum12,660
| 1–1
|- align="center" bgcolor="#ffcccc"
| 3
| April 10
| @ Kansas City
| L 92–93
| Johnson, Adams (19)
| Dennis Johnson (9)
| three players tied (4)
| Kemper Arena13,776
| 1–2
|- align="center" bgcolor="#ffcccc"
| 4
| April 12
| @ Kansas City
| L 95–102
| Truck Robinson (23)
| Truck Robinson (13)
| Alvan Adams (4)
| Kemper Arena11,089
| 1–3
|- align="center" bgcolor="#ccffcc"
| 5
| April 15
| Kansas City
| W 101–89
| Walter Davis (20)
| Truck Robinson (20)
| Johnson, Davis (4)
| Arizona Veterans Memorial Coliseum12,660
| 2–3
|- align="center" bgcolor="#ccffcc"
| 6
| April 17
| @ Kansas City
| W 81–76
| Dennis Johnson (17)
| Truck Robinson (10)
| Alvan Adams (7)
| Kemper Arena15,232
| 3–3
|- align="center" bgcolor="#ffcccc"
| 7
| April 19
| Kansas City
| L 88–95
| Dennis Johnson (28)
| Johnson, Adams (7)
| Dennis Johnson (5)
| Arizona Veterans Memorial Coliseum12,660
| 3–4
|-

Awards and honors

All-Star
 Walter Davis was voted as a starter for the Western Conference in the All-Star Game. It was his fourth consecutive All-Star selection. Davis finished second in voting among Western Conference forwards with 172,479 votes.
 Dennis Johnson was selected as a reserve for the Western Conference in the All-Star Game. It was his third consecutive All-Star selection. Johnson finished fifth in voting among Western Conference guards with 123,287 votes.
 Truck Robinson was selected as a reserve for the Western Conference in the All-Star Game. It was his second All-Star selection.
 John MacLeod coached the Western Conference All-Star team in a 120–123 loss to the East.

Season
 Dennis Johnson was named to the All-NBA First Team. Johnson also finished eighth in MVP voting.
 Dennis Johnson was named to the NBA All-Defensive First Team.
 Alvan Adams had the league's best defensive rating, allowing 96.2 points per 100 possessions.
 Truck Robinson finished 19th in MVP voting.
 Walter Davis finished 24th in MVP voting.

Player statistics

Season

|- align="center" bgcolor=""
|  || 75 || 69 || 27.4 || .526 || . || .768 || 7.3 || style="background:#FF8800;color:#423189;" | 4.6 || 1.4 || style="background:#FF8800;color:#423189;" | .9 || 14.9
|- align="center" bgcolor="#f0f0f0"
|  || 79 || 77 || 27.7 || .464 || .000 || .645 || 5.9 || 2.5 || 1.0 || .7 || 8.5
|- align="center" bgcolor=""
|  || 78 || 77 || 28.0 || style="background:#FF8800;color:#423189;" | .539 || .412 || .836 || 2.6 || 3.9 || 1.2 || .2 || 18.0
|- align="center" bgcolor="#f0f0f0"
|  || 81 || 10 || 21.6 || .427 || .083 || .693 || 2.8 || 2.5 || 1.6 || .3 || 8.4
|- align="center" bgcolor=""
|  || 79 || 77 || 33.1 || .436 || .216 || .820 || 4.6 || 3.7 || style="background:#FF8800;color:#423189;" | 1.7 || .8 || 18.8
|- align="center" bgcolor="#f0f0f0"
|  || 81 || 13 || 20.8 || .506 || .000 || .758 || 5.4 || 3.5 || 1.0 || .8 || 7.0
|- align="center" bgcolor=""
|  || style="background:#FF8800;color:#423189;" | 82 || 0 || 13.0 || .527 || .000 || .692 || 2.8 || 1.1 || .4 || .2 || 4.1
|- align="center" bgcolor="#f0f0f0"
|  || style="background:#FF8800;color:#423189;" | 82 || 0 || 17.9 || .511 || .235 || style="background:#FF8800;color:#423189;" | .899 || 1.6 || 2.0 || .9 || .1 || 8.1
|- align="center" bgcolor=""
|  || 44 || 0 || 5.3 || .348 || style="background:#FF8800;color:#423189;" | .500 || .459 || 1.3 || 0.3 || .2 || .0 || 2.6
|- align="center" bgcolor="#f0f0f0"
|  || style="background:#FF8800;color:#423189;" | 82 || style="background:#FF8800;color:#423189;" | 82 || style="background:#FF8800;color:#423189;" | 37.7 || .505 || . || .629 || style="background:#FF8800;color:#423189;" | 9.6 || 2.5 || .8 || .5 || style="background:#FF8800;color:#423189;" | 18.8
|- align="center" bgcolor=""
|  || style="background:#FF8800;color:#423189;" | 82 || 5 || 17.4 || .497 || .167 || .764 || 3.3 || 1.4 || .7 || .9 || 5.4
|}

Playoffs

|- align="center" bgcolor=""
|  || style="background:#FF8800;color:#423189;" | 7 || style="background:#FF8800;color:#423189;" | 7 || 31.1 || .450 || . || .714 || 5.9 || style="background:#FF8800;color:#423189;" | 3.7 || .6 || .1 || 10.6
|- align="center" bgcolor="#f0f0f0"
|  || style="background:#FF8800;color:#423189;" | 7 || style="background:#FF8800;color:#423189;" | 7 || 29.4 || .463 || style="background:#FF8800;color:#423189;" | 1.000 || .737 || 6.7 || 1.6 || .1 || .0 || 9.3
|- align="center" bgcolor=""
|  || style="background:#FF8800;color:#423189;" | 7 || style="background:#FF8800;color:#423189;" | 7 || 28.4 || style="background:#FF8800;color:#423189;" | .481† || .000 || .588 || 2.7 || 3.1 || 1.0 || .1 || 16.0
|- align="center" bgcolor="#f0f0f0"
|  || style="background:#FF8800;color:#423189;" | 7 || 0 || 16.7 || .424 || . || .643 || 2.7 || 0.9 || .9 || .3 || 5.3
|- align="center" bgcolor=""
|  || style="background:#FF8800;color:#423189;" | 7 || style="background:#FF8800;color:#423189;" | 7 || style="background:#FF8800;color:#423189;" | 38.1 || .473 || .200 || style="background:#FF8800;color:#423189;" | .762^ || 4.7 || 2.9 || style="background:#FF8800;color:#423189;" | 1.3 || style="background:#FF8800;color:#423189;" | 1.3 || style="background:#FF8800;color:#423189;" | 19.6
|- align="center" bgcolor="#f0f0f0"
|  || style="background:#FF8800;color:#423189;" | 7 || 0 || 16.1 || .400 || .000 || .643 || 5.0 || 1.9 || .9 || .4 || 4.1
|- align="center" bgcolor=""
|  || style="background:#FF8800;color:#423189;" | 7 || 0 || 14.4 || .520† || . || .500 || 2.3 || 0.6 || .3 || .3 || 3.9
|- align="center" bgcolor="#f0f0f0"
|  || style="background:#FF8800;color:#423189;" | 7 || 0 || 14.6 || .528† || .500 || 1.000^ || 1.9 || 1.6 || .7 || .0 || 7.0
|- align="center" bgcolor=""
|  || 2 || 0 || 2.0 || .000 || . || . || 0.0 || 0.0 || .5 || .0 || 0.0
|- align="center" bgcolor="#f0f0f0"
|  || style="background:#FF8800;color:#423189;" | 7 || style="background:#FF8800;color:#423189;" | 7 || 33.3 || .351 || . || .588 || style="background:#FF8800;color:#423189;" | 10.7 || 1.9 || .7 || .3 || 10.6
|- align="center" bgcolor=""
|  || style="background:#FF8800;color:#423189;" | 7 || 0 || 17.1 || .467 || . || .667 || 2.7 || 1.0 || .6 || .9 || 5.4
|}

† – Minimum 20 field goals made.
^ – Minimum 10 free throws made.

Transactions

Trades

Free agents

Additions

Subtractions

References

Phoenix Suns seasons
Ph